John Henry de la Poer Beresford, 5th Marquess of Waterford  (21 May 184423 October 1895), styled Earl of Tyrone from 1859 to 1866, was an Irish peer and Conservative politician. He served as Master of the Buckhounds under Lord Salisbury from 1885 to 1886.

Background
Lord Waterford was the eldest son of John Beresford, 4th Marquess of Waterford, by his wife Christiana Leslie. He was the elder brother of Lord Charles Beresford, Lord William Beresford and Lord Marcus Beresford.

Political career
Lord Waterford was returned to Parliament for County Waterford in 1865, a seat he held until the following year, when he succeeded his father in the marquessate and took his seat in the House of Lords. In 1868 he was made a Knight of the Order of St Patrick. He was appointed Lord Lieutenant of Waterford in 1874, which he remained until his death, and was admitted to the Irish Privy Council in 1879. In 1885 he was sworn of the British Privy Council and appointed Master of the Buckhounds under Lord Salisbury, a post he held until the fall of the Conservative administration in early 1886.

In humour
W. S. Gilbert refers to Lord Waterford as "reckless and rollicky" in Colonel Calverley's song "If You Want A Receipt For That Popular Mystery" from the Gilbert and Sullivan opera Patience.

Family
Lord Waterford eloped with Florence Grosvenor Rowley, wife of John Vivian and married her on 9August 1872. He married secondly, Lady Blanche Somerset, daughter of Henry Somerset, 8th Duke of Beaufort, on 21July 1874. The second Lady Waterford suffered from a severe illness which left her an invalid.  She had a special carriage designed to carry her around the estate at Curraghmore. Lord Waterford and his second wife had four children:

Henry de la Poer Beresford, 6th Marquess of Waterford (1875–1911)
Lady Mary Beresford (1877–1877), died in infancy
Lady Susan de la Poer Beresford, twin sister of Lady Mary (1877–1947), married Major Hon. Hugh Dawnay, son of Hugh Dawnay, 8th Viscount Downe and had issue, including Maj-Gen Sir David Dawnay
Lady Clodagh Beresford (1879–1957), married Hon. Claud Anson, son of Thomas Anson, 2nd Earl of Lichfield and had issue

Lord Waterford committed suicide in October 1895, aged 51, and was succeeded in the marquessate by his only son, Henry. Many national newspapers expressed their sorrow at Lord Waterford's suicide, especially given his position in society.

References

External links

1844 births
1895 deaths
Knights of St Patrick
Lord-Lieutenants of Waterford
Members of the Privy Council of Ireland
Members of the Privy Council of the United Kingdom
Tyrone, John Beresford, Earl of
Tyrone, John Beresford, Earl of
UK MPs who inherited peerages
John
5
Masters of the Buckhounds